Novomalyn is a village in Rivne Raion, Rivne Oblast, Ukraine, but was formerly administered within Ostroh Raion. As of the year 2001, the community had 677 residents. The postal code is 35843, and the KOATUU code is 5624285601.

References

External links 
 Article Nowomalin in the Geographical Dictionary of the Kingdom of Poland, Volume VII (Netrebka — Perepiat), 1886 year 
 Description Novomalyn castle in the site «Historical Volyn» 
 Shield and flad of Novomalyn 
 Photos of Novomalyn Castle 
 Weather in the Novomalyn 

Volhynian Governorate
Wołyń Voivodeship (1921–1939)

Villages in Rivne Raion